The Dinosaur Project is a 2012 British found footage science fiction thriller drama adventure film edited by Ben Lester, produced by Moonlighting Films, Kent Films, LoveFilm, Anton Capital Entertainment, Dinosaur Productions and Nick Hill, distributed by StudioCanal, music composed by Richard Blair-Oliphant, based on an original idea by Sid Bennett and Tom Pridham, written by Sid Bennett and Jay Basu, and directed by Sid Bennett. It stars Richard Dillane, Peter Brooke, Matthew Kane, Natasha Loring, Stephen Jennings, Andre Weideman with Abena Ayivor and Sivu Nobongoza. The visual effects for the film were provided by Jellyfish Pictures. The Dinosaur Project was filmed in South Africa on 8 August 2012. The film was rated PG-13 for some violence, terror and a brief suggestive image. The film was released in cinemas in the UK on 10 August 2012 by StudioCanal. The movie has received mixed reviews from critics and grossed $2,412,576 worldwide. The film was released on DVD and Blu-ray on 27 February 2013 by StudioCanal.

Plot
A group of explorers from the British Cryptozoological Society (and two television cameramen) goes on an expedition into the Congo in search of a cryptid—the so-called Mokele-mbembe—which is believed to be a Plesiosaur called Elasmosaurus.

The explorers' leader, Jonathan, discovers during the helicopter flight, that his son Luke sneaked into the chopper as a stowaway. Shortly after that, a flock of large flying reptiles (pterosaurs) called Pteranodons appears next to the helicopter, causing the helicopter to crash. Everyone but the pilot escape just before the chopper explodes. Now lost, they discover that the satellite phone they had with them was broken during the crash, Amara, their local guide, suggests to go to the village they saw while in the helicopter. Upon arriving, the group discovers the village destroyed and the villagers dead.  Jonathan chooses a hut to stay in for the night while his son installs a night vision camera outside the hut.

At night, everyone is wakened by a swarm of bat-like reptiles (maybe Dimorphodon or Anurognathus) outside.  They try to flee the village because it's infested with the animals.  Liz, their medic, is attacked and killed while the rest escape in a pair of wooden boats. After the boats get wrecked by an unseen force they arrive on a small island and decide to camp out for the night.  As they talk around the fire they encounter a small unknown creastless theropod (Dilophosaurus).  It particularly takes a liking to Luke.  Luke names it "Crypto" after the term cryptozoology for short and decides to attach one of his cameras onto Crypto's neck to see where he would go.  The broadcast cuts out as the dinosaurs swim into a cave.

When the broadcast returns, Luke and Charlie see that Crypto went straight to some kind of underground gateway, where the camera is dropped. When they try to steer through a whitewater, Luke's and Charlie's boat gets separated.  The rest of the explorers rejoin them in a river canyon, where they encounter a magnificent Elasmosaurus.  As they view the beast a vicious Pliosaur (Liopleurodon) suddenly emerges and attacks the group.  The Elasmosaurus flees as well.  Believing that the rest of the group died, Charlie and Luke continue to search for the place where the dinosaurs came from. When Charlie learns that Luke has fixed the satellite phone, he pushes Luke down into the gateway to kill him.

On the other side of the underground passageway, Luke speaks into the camera, trying to reach the other survivors via the monitor to no avail. Meanwhile, Amara leaves the other survivors, taking one of the boats. Jonathan and Pete continue the search for Luke and Charlie. In the meantime, Luke meets Crypto and follows him deeper into the jungle, where he is attacked by the bat-like creatures. He is rescued by Pete, who chases the creatures into the jungle, when he is suddenly encircled by them and presumably killed. Charlie is seen, speaking to the camera, when he is interrupted and forced to hide by Jonathan and Luke, continuing through the jungle. They follow a steep cliffway, when they are hit by a rockfall caused by Charlie. Luke tries to help his father who is holding onto a rock, but his father ends up falling down the cliff.

Luke hides in the dense jungle, evading Charlie who is chasing him, when he meets Crypto who leads him to the place where he dropped his camera earlier, when suddenly Charlie emerges in front of him, intending to kill him. Crypto spits fluid into Luke's face, when two adult giant creastless Dilophosaurus (presumably Crypto's parents) appear. Sniffing at Luke and smelling the fluid, they leave him alone, most likely because he smells like one of their offspring, and they brutally kill Charlie.

Luke proceeds into the jungle and stops at a high cliff, filming himself and Crypto, he says that the satellite phone has been crushed again and that he has to destroy the cameras to use the parts, he waves the camera over the view from the cliff, showing a big valley full of dinosaurs from afar which seems there is a herd of unknown sauropods and an unknown theropod stalking the herd. In the next scene he is seen throwing the backpack down a waterfall into a river. Luke's fate is unknown.

The floating backpack is found by men in a boat, who find video hard drives and tapes labelled "the Dinosaur Project" inside. In a blurry video, Luke says "I think it works".

Cast
 Richard Dillane as Jonathan Marchant
 Peter Brooke as Charlie Rutherford
 Matthew Kane as Luke Marchant
 Natasha Loring as Liz Draper
 Stephen Jennings as Dave Moore
 Andre Weideman as Pete Van Aarde
 Abena Ayivor as Amara 
 Sivu Nobogonza as Etienne

Production

Filming
The Dinosaur Project was filmed at South Africa on 8 August 2012.

Release

Theatrical release
The film was released in cinemas in the UK on 10 August 2012. It was scheduled for release in cinemas worldwide through 2012–13, starting with South-East Asia on 23 August 2012.

International releases
UK – 10 August 2012
Ireland – 10 August 2012
Brazil – 7 September 2012
Estonia – 5 October 2012
Singapore – 18 October 2012
Greece – 1 November 2012
Mexico – 2 November 2012
France – 9 November 2012
Russia – 7 February 2013
Sweden – 27 February 2013
Philippines – 13 March 2013
Japan – 16 March 2013
Australia – 20 March 2013
Italy – 18 July 2013
Taiwan – 16 August 2013
Venezuela – 16 August 2013
Argentina – 18 September 2013

Home media
The film was released on DVD and Blu-ray on 27 February 2013 by StudioCanal.

Reception

Critical reception

The movie has received mixed reviews from critics. Review aggregator Rotten Tomatoes gave the film a 49% rotten rating based on 14 critic reviews, with an average rating of 5.33/10. The Financial Times awarded the film 4 out of 5 stars (80%) and called it "rip-roaring fun...Feature debutant Sid Bennett's motion-capture movie also does emotion capture. You will jump, gasp, grimace, just like the characters. The creatures are often very creepy. The Cloverfield-style dependency on "found footage" means everyone on screen must have a camera, but even that is carried off with dash and nonchalance." Digital Spy awarded the movie 3 stars out of 5 (60%) and labelled it "Decent found-footage caper...The Dinosaur Project is good and undemanding fun. There are enough sharp claws to overcome the flaws and ensure this is never a dino-bore... The Guardian wrote 'The CGI monsters are surprisingly convincing and children will identify with the intrepid 15-year-old lad who stows away on his dad's helicopter and turns up trumps by using his computer wizardry." Katie Fraser of Screenjabber.com awarded the film 3½ stars out of 5, writing "If you don't mind the shakiness of the found-footage genre (beware – a headache is likely), definitely go see this film if not for the computer-generated dinosaurs. It's no Jurassic Park, but they did create some pretty cool-looking prehistoric monsters." Total Film awarded it three stars out of five and said "Though it's desperate to be the next Jurassic Park, there's little Spielbergian bite to this low-budget Brit flick. Instead we get wobbly cameras and equally wobbly acting from a cast of unknowns as a group of explorers hunt dinos in the Congo....Its money shots generally impress, and the breakneck pace bounds over a multitude of sins – including Park's deadly dilophosaurus getting a makeover as a cute little critter that'll have the nippers cooing." IGN awarded the film 4 out of ten and said "Writer-director Sid Bennett does manage to eek moments of tension out of the premise, and the vast African vistas glimpsed throughout are a joy to behold...a found footage flick that disappoints at just about every turn, and makes you wish the tapes had remained lost." The Independent awarded the film two stars out of five and said "The script stinks like dino-poo... but for all the silliness you may find yourself entertained." SFX awarded the film two and a half out of five stars and said "...has just enough charm to be worth a look – particularly if you have kids who like watching giant reptiles eating people...A few unexpected twists that mark it out as interesting (the running order of the deaths isn't quite what you'd expect, for example) and the dinos are a cut above most films of this nature – particularly one little cutie who's basically dino-Lassie. Admirably, the vast majority of the action is shot on location, with some white-water rafting to spice up the scenes with no reptiles in. Despite the plus points, though, it's still a cheesy, childish adventure which tries very hard not to be the TV movie it actually is." Empire Magazine awarded the film two stars out of five and said that the film was "More Terra Nova meets Sanctum 3D than Jurassic Park meets Cloverfield." On its international cinema release, debuting in South East Asia, the movie was a commercial hit, entering the Malaysian box office charts in second position behind The Expendables 2. On its release in Thailand, The Dinosaur Project attained third spot.

Box office
The Dinosaur Project grossed $2,412,576 from cinemas worldwide. DVD and TV sales totals to date have not been collated.

Rating
The Dinosaur Project was rated PG-13 for some violence, terror and a brief suggestive image.

Music
Richard Blair-Oliphant scored the music for the film and on its soundtrack.

References

External links
 
 

2012 films
Films about dinosaurs
Films shot in South Africa
Films set in the Democratic Republic of the Congo
Found footage films
British science fiction films
2010s English-language films
2010s British films